The O'Reilly Auto Parts 275 was a NASCAR Craftsman Truck Series race held at the Heartland Park Topeka road course, in Topeka, Kansas. It was first held during the inaugural season for the Craftsman Truck Series in 1995, and remained a part of the series through the 1999 season. The race date fluctuated, being run in June, July, and August over the course of its existence.

Unlike most NASCAR races, the advertised distance of the race was measured in kilometers as opposed to miles and changed distance several times in its history.

History

The first race at Topeka was held on July 29, 1995, and was won by Ron Hornaday Jr. in the No. 16 Chevrolet for Dale Earnhardt, Inc., who started from the pole position and led all but two laps of the  sponsorless race. As in 1995, the race was dominated by one driver. This time it was Mike Skinner in the No. 3 Chevrolet for Richard Childress Racing, who led 70 of 77 laps en route to victory.

The first 275-kilometer race was run in 1997 and won by Joe Ruttman in the No. 80 Ford for Roush Racing. Although Ruttman started on the pole, he led just five laps and won when leader Jay Sauter, who was trying to give the No. 3 Chevrolet its second Topeka win, ran out of gas on the final lap. The 1998 race ended in similar circumstances. The race was dominated by Tom Hubert and Mike Bliss, but both's trucks succumbed to engine failure late in the race. When Bliss' engine expired with seven laps to go, Stacy Compton, in the No. 86 Ford for Impact Motorsports, took the lead and held it to the finish.

For the final race in 1999, O'Reilly Auto Parts took over as the sponsor and six laps were removed from the distance. Mike Bliss, in the No. 99 Ford for Roush Racing, found redemption, winning the race after losing an engine in the 1998 event. He took the lead from Jay Sauter with six laps to go and became the first and only Topeka winner to win from outside the top 10 (15th). Bliss' win also made Roush Racing the only team to win twice at this track.

Past winners

Race length notes
1995–1996: 1.8 mile course
1997–1999: 2.1 mile course

Multiple winners (teams)

Manufacturer wins

References

External links

1995 establishments in Kansas
1999 disestablishments in Kansas
Former NASCAR races
NASCAR Truck Series races
NASCAR races at Heartland Park Topeka
Recurring sporting events disestablished in 1999
Recurring sporting events established in 1995